Wanquan is a town under the administration of the county-level city of Honghu, in the south of Hubei province, China. It is located to the north of both downtown Honghu and Lake Hong.

Administrative divisions
Two communities:
 Wanquan
 Yongfeng

Twenty-six villages:
Hongxinghe, Hongshan, Hezui, Gaohu, Zhinan, Wanquan, Wandian, Huangsi, Wangmiao, Yongfeng, Laogou, Shidang, Hongsanqiao, Zhengdaohu, Hedian, Huagu, Zhaobagou, Zhongling, Ma'an, Zhangdang, Shuanghong, Xiaohe, Nanbeiling, Xujiatan, Dongyuemiao, and Jianjiakou

One fishery:
Wanquan

References 

Township-level divisions of Hubei
Honghu